The Election Committee constituency (ECC) is a constituency in the elections for the Legislative Council of Hong Kong. It was first created in 1995, re-created with a different composition in 1998 until it was abolished in 2004, and created for the third time in the 2021 electoral overhaul. It is the single largest constituency, taking 40 out of the 90 seats in the Legislative Council.

The Election Committee constituency was one of the three sectors designed in the Basic Law of Hong Kong next to the directly elected geographical constituencies and the indirectly elected functional constituencies in the early SAR period. With the last British Governor Chris Patten's electoral reform, the ECC was composed of all elected District Board members who had been elected in 1994. The Single Transferable Vote system was used in the 1995 election.

After the handover of Hong Kong, the ECC was allocated 10 seats out of the total 60 seats in the SAR Legislative Council, comprising all members of the Election Committee which also elected the Chief Executive every five years. The size of the constituency reduced to six seats in 2000 and was entirely abolished and replaced by the directly elected geographical constituency seats in the 2004 election. The plurality-at-large voting system was used in 1998 and 2000.

In the 2021 electoral overhaul, the Election Committee constituency was reintroduced, taking 40 of the 90 seats, almost half, of the Legislative Council with plurality-at-large voting system. The electorate is composed of all newly expanded 1,500 members in the Election Committee.

Returning members

1995–1997

1998–2004

2021–2025

Election results 
The elected candidates are shown in bold.

2020s

2000s

1990s

 

Single transferable vote was used in the 1995 election.

References 

Constituencies of Hong Kong
Constituencies of Hong Kong Legislative Council
1995 establishments in Hong Kong
Constituencies established in 1995
1998 establishments in Hong Kong
Constituencies established in 1998
2004 disestablishments in Hong Kong
Constituencies disestablished in 2004
2021 establishments in Hong Kong
Constituencies established in 2021